Central Milton Keynes is the central business district of Milton Keynes, Buckinghamshire, England and a civil parish in its own right, with a town council.

It contains (behind the Central Library) the historic site of the moot hill for Secklow (or Sigelai) Hundred. It is the site of the central retail, business, law enforcement and governmental districts, Milton Keynes Central railway station and around 2,000 residential dwellings.

This area is known locally as "the city centre".

Topology
Occupying , the district lies between Portway (H5, A509) to the north, the West Coast Main Line and A5 to the west, Childs Way (H6) to the south and the Grand Union Canal to the east. It is crossed from north to south by (in west to east order, major roads only) Grafton Gate (V6), Witan Gate, Saxon Gate (V7) and Secklow Gate, and Marlborough Street. It is crossed from west to east (in north to south order, major roads only) by Silbury Boulevard, Midsummer Boulevard and Avebury Boulevard. Midsummer Boulevard is the primary spine. 

This area is almost the highest point of Milton Keynes and includes the site of Secklow Mound, the moot mound (meeting place) for the Secklow Hundred and a scheduled ancient monument, just behind the central library.

Astronomical alignment

While still on the drawing board, planners noticed that the planned main streets in the proposed city centre would almost frame the rising sun on Midsummer's Day. This story has become embellished over time and, according to subsequent reports, they consulted Greenwich Observatory to obtain the exact angle required at the latitude of CMK, and persuaded the engineers to shift the grid of roads a few degrees in response. Physical reality does not match this report. From the highest point on Midsummer Boulevard, where the eastward horizon is unobstructed, the sunrise at 'first flash' is not aligned with the Boulevard. In reality, the sun is somewhat elevated before alignment occurs, 40 minutes later.

East of Marlborough Street: Campbell Park

The park, with housing either side, takes up the larger part of the district. It was named in honour of the first chairman of Milton Keynes Development Corporation, Lord Campbell of Eskan. It stretches just east of the shops and theatre down to the Grand Union Canal. Among the features of the park is a belvedere with extensive views over Bedfordshire to the east and a cricket ground with pavilion. The Milton Keynes Parks Trust, which manages the park, grazes sheep on it to keep the vegetation under control.

Marlborough Street (V8, B4034) runs in a cutting through the ridge, bridged by a redway (shared path) between the main centre and the park.

West of Marlborough Street, east of Saxon Gate: the main retail/service/entertainment district

This area is defined by the Marlborough Street (V8, B4034)  to the north-east, the Saxon Gate (Saxon Street, V7) to the south-west, Portway (H5, A509) to the north-west and Childs Way (H6) to the south-east. The core retail district is further delimited by Silbury and Avebury Boulevards, with civic and office developments outside the Boulevards.

The retail district includes thecentre:mk and Midsummer Place (the covered high streets that are the Central Milton Keynes shopping centres).

The Secklow Mound, the Central Library, Milton Keynes City Council civic offices and other commercial offices are on the north side of Silbury Boulevard, which separates them from the shops. Midsummer Boulevard runs along the south side of the Centre:MK, separating the shops from the theatre, art gallery, Theatre District, the Xscape building, pubs, sports shops and other leisure facilities. The civic offices were designed by FaulknerBrowns Architects and completed in 1979.

Xscape

Xscape Milton Keynes is the main leisure complex in Central Milton Keynes consisting of SnoZone, a real snow indoor ski slope, a multiscreen cinema, and a number of shops, restaurants and night clubs. At the rear of the site is iFly, the first publicly available indoor skydiving column in the UK.

Theatre and municipal art gallery
The municipal public art gallery, MK Gallery, presents exhibitions of international contemporary and classical art. The gallery was extended and remodelled in 2018/19 and includes an art-house cinema. It does not have a permanent collection.

The adjacent 1,400-seat Milton Keynes Theatre opened in 1999. The theatre has an unusual feature: the ceiling can be lowered closing off the third tier (gallery) to create a more intimate space for smaller-scale productions.

West of Saxon Gate, east of Grafton Gate: the main business district

This area is also delimited by Portway and Childs Way. Saxon Gate separates it from the north-east area and Grafton Gate (Grafton Street, V7) marks its south-western edge. The domed Church of Christ the Cornerstone, law courts and police station are in the business district, beside the small linear Fred Roche Gardens and Grafton Park that provides its core.

Ecumenical Church of Christ the Cornerstone

This ecumenical church, the first such in the United Kingdom, is shared by the major Christian denominations to serve the office workers and the small resident population. (There are many denominational places of worship elsewhere in Milton Keynes).

The Hub:MK
The Hub:MK is a 2006-built development between the station and the church, consisting of towers ranging between 10 and 14 storeys. The complex includes two high-rise hotels and a number of residential and office towers set around a central piazza. The site controversially involves the closure of one of the original pedestrian underpasses and is built right up to the edge of the adjacent boulevard, the first of several proposals that would have changed the unique character of Milton Keynes Development Corporation's original design for Central Milton Keynes. The work is part of the 'densification' plan that central government, through its agency English Partnerships, had ordained for Milton Keynes. Its height, also a major departure from the original low-rise design, makes it the third tallest building in Milton Keynes, beaten only by the 14-storey Xscape and the 18-storey Mellish Court in Bletchley.

To the south of the Hub lies a similar development named Vizion. This is similar in height and layout to the Hub but features a large Sainsbury's supermarket taking up the lower two floors with a rooftop garden above it. Vizion was completed in 2009, whilst the following year saw the completion of the 9-storey Pinnacle office development further west along Midsummer Boulevard from the Hub, closer to the railway station. The latter is distinctive for the slanted roof on its tallest section.

Higher education 

, Milton Keynes does not have its own conventional undergraduate university, though it contains the campus of the national Open University. There is an outpost of the University of Bedfordshire in a CMK office block.

Cranfield University and the Milton Keynes City Council are partners in a detailed proposal to establish an undergraduate campus, code-named MK:U. The plan anticipates opening by 2023, with a campus in the block contained by Grafton Street / Avebury Boulevard / Witan Gate / Childs Way. In January 2019, the partners announced an international competition to design the new campus. In May 2019, Santander Bank announced a 'seed funding' grant of £30M to help with building and initial running costs. On 4 July 2019, the shortlisted proposals for the campus were announced. On 30 July 2019, the evaluation panel announced that Hopkins Architects had produced the winning design. 

, the project is stalled pending assurance of government funding.

West of Grafton Gate: the station district

This district is defined by Saxon Gate (Saxon Street, V7) to the north-east, the West Coast Main Line (and the adjacent A5) to the south-west, Portway (H5, A509) to the north-west and Childs Way (H6) to the south-east. The core retail district is further delimited by Silbury and Avebury Boulevards, with civic and office developments outside the Boulevards.

The main feature of the district is the Milton Keynes Central railway station (an inter-city stop on the West Coast Main Line), one of the seven stations serving the Milton Keynes urban area. Coach services operate from here as well as from the Milton Keynes coachway next to junction 14 of the M1 motorway. Services include the Stagecoach X5 service that replaces the Varsity Line, which links Milton Keynes with Oxford in the west (for connections to the west and Wales) and Cambridge in the east; and the 99 service to Luton Airport, operated by Stagecoach East. The station building houses commercial office lets and food outlets, and the Station Square development includes further office lets and retail outlets.

The bus interchange bays are located at the railway station forecourt. (The former central bus station is located opposite the railway station but has not been operating as such since 1997. The upstairs level of the bus station (formerly a night club) accommodates a young peoples' facility, 'the Buszy'. This includes an award-winning covered "urban" skate-boarding area, which has attracted international 'skaters' and film crews).

The former England National Hockey Stadium was located on a site to the north of the station, surrounded by a number of important retail units. Having been vacated, this was demolished in early 2010 and the site redeveloped as the Quadrant:MK, the headquarters for Network Rail. To the south of the station, there is another leisure and retail area – the Leisure Plaza, notably the Planet Ice Arena (home of Milton Keynes Lightning) and what was another ten-pin bowling alley.

Civil parish
Central Milton Keynes is a civil parish, bordering (clockwise from north) Great Linford, Campbell Park, Loughton, and Bradwell. The parish was created in 2001, and had a population of 2,726 according to the 2011 census.

ONS Urban sub-area

For the 2001 Census, the Office for National Statistics designated an urban sub-area (map) that it called "Central Milton Keynes". This was far bigger than either the district or the parish. Since the 2011 Census, this nomenclature is no longer used.

Media
Locations around Central Milton Keynes were used for the movie Superman IV: The Quest for Peace, where it played the part of the United Nations building. Recognisable locations include Milton Keynes Central, CBX and the Argos (now Home Retail Group) building on Avebury Boulevard.

Gallery

See also
 Milton Keynes for a more general description of the amenities of the wider area.
 Central Milton Keynes Shopping Centre
 Milton Keynes Central railway station
 Milton Keynes Village

Notes

References

External links
 Milton Keynes City Centre Management
 MK Gallery
 

Milton Keynes
Civil parishes in Buckinghamshire
Towns in Buckinghamshire